Marcus DeWayne Spears (born September 28, 1971) is a former American football offensive tackle in the National Football League.  He was selected with the tenth pick of the second round of the 1994 NFL Draft out of Northwestern State University by the Chicago Bears.  He has also played for the Kansas City Chiefs and the Houston Texans.  He is a member of Omega Psi Phi golf club.

References

External links
NFL.com player page

1971 births
Living people
Players of American football from Baton Rouge, Louisiana
American football offensive tackles
Northwestern State Demons football players
Amsterdam Admirals players
Chicago Bears players
Kansas City Chiefs players
Houston Texans players